The 1911 World Series was the championship series in Major League Baseball for the 1911 season. The eighth edition of the World Series, it matched the American League (AL) champion Philadelphia Athletics against the National League (NL) champion New York Giants. The Athletics won the best-of-seven series four games to two, in a rematch of the 1905 World Series, getting revenge over the Giants, who had won in their previous meeting.

Philadelphia third baseman Frank "Home Run" Baker earned his nickname during this Series. His home run in Game 2 off Rube Marquard was the margin of victory for the Athletics, and his blast in Game 3 off Christy Mathewson tied that game in the ninth inning, and the Athletics eventually won in the 11th. The Giants never recovered. Ironically, Mathewson (or his ghostwriter) had criticized Marquard in his newspaper column after Game 2 for giving up the gopher ball, only to fall victim himself the very next day. Baker was swinging a hot bat in general, going 9 for 24 to lead all batters in the Series with a .375 average.

According to his obituary in The New York Times (July 28, 1971), Giants catcher Chief Meyers threw out 12 runners, creating a record for the most assists by a catcher during the World Series.

The six consecutive days of rain between Games 3 and 4 caused the longest delay between World Series games until the earthquake-interrupted 1989 Series (which incidentally featured the same two franchises, albeit on the West Coast, and which also resulted in an A's victory over the Giants). With the sixth and final game being played on October 26, this was also the latest-ending World Series by calendar date until the 1981 Series.

This was the second time in World Series history that two teams met in a World Series rematch. The first time was when the Chicago Cubs and Detroit Tigers met in consecutive years, in 1907 and 1908.

Summary

Matchups

Game 1

With a perfect top of the first, Christy Mathewson set the record with 28 straight shutout innings in World Series play, a record that would be broken by Boston Red Sox's Babe Ruth with  innings in the 1918 World Series. Mathewson's postseason record for consecutive scoreless innings against one team would not be broken until 2013 when the Detroit Tigers' Justin Verlander shut out the Athletics (now playing in Oakland) for 30 consecutive innings in the 2012 and 2013 ALDS.

Game 2

With the score tied at 1 and with Eddie Collins on second, Frank Baker blasted a two-run home run off Rube Marquard to deep right field for the go ahead score and the Athletics held on to win game 2, 3–1.

Game 3

With the Giants up 1–0 going into the ninth with Mathewson on the mound, it appeared the series was going to be 2–1 New York. But with one out, Baker stepped up to the plate and blasted his second home run in as many games to tie it at 1. Thus, the nickname "Home Run" Baker was born. Two innings later with the score still tied at 1, Baker singled and scored on an error to make it 3–1. The Giants rallied for one run in the bottom half but the game ended with a runner being thrown out on a stolen base attempt.

Game 4

After six days of rain, the series resumed. Chief Bender, after giving up two runs in the first, shut out the Giants the rest of the way on his way to a 4–2 win and 3–1 series lead.

Game 5

On the verge of elimination, the Giants fought back. They tied it at 3 with two runs in the bottom of the ninth, and then won it with a run in the tenth when Larry Doyle scored on a sacrifice fly. Home plate umpire Bill Klem later said Doyle had failed to touch home plate after sliding in. Since none of the Athletics noticed this and Philadelphia failed to appeal, Klem had to let the winning run stand. Josh Devore became the first player to get a game-tying hit in the World Series with his team one out from elimination, a feat that would not be repeated until Otis Nixon in 1992 World Series.

Game 6

Bender threw a 4-hitter to clinch the series, the Athletics second consecutive World Series title. The A's pitching staff held the Giants to a .175 team batting average, lowest ever for a 6-game series.

Composite line score
1911 World Series (4–2): Philadelphia Athletics (A.L.) over New York Giants (N.L.)

See also
Playograph – photo during 1911 World Series game

Notes

References

External links

World Series
New York Giants (NL) postseason
Philadelphia Athletics postseason
World Series
World Series
World Series
1910s in Philadelphia
World Series
Baseball competitions in New York City
Baseball competitions in Philadelphia
1910s in Manhattan
Washington Heights, Manhattan